Antoine Gomez (26 August 1927 – January 2010) was a Portuguese-French racing cyclist. He rode in the 1949 Tour de France, abandoning the race during the second stage.

References

External links

1927 births
2010 deaths
French male cyclists
Portuguese male cyclists

French people of Portuguese descent